Carnbee is a place name for the following:

Carnbee, Fife, a village and rural parish in Fife, Scotland
Carnbee, Trinidad and Tobago, a town